Dejair Igor Silvério Ribeiro, simply known as Dejair (born 30 November 1994), is a Brazilian footballer who plays as a defensive midfielder.

Club career
Born in Contagem, Dejair finished his graduation at Portuguesa's youth setup, and made his first-team debut on 28 April 2013, coming on as a late substitute in a 4–1 home success against Catanduvense, in that year's Campeonato Paulista Série A2, which Lusa was crowned champions.

After returning to the youth setup in January 2014, he played his second match for Portuguesa on 5 February 2014, playing the last 22 minutes of a 3–1 win at Atlético Sorocaba. He was released in December 2014, after the expiry of his contract.

References

External links

1994 births
Living people
Brazilian footballers
Association football midfielders
Campeonato Brasileiro Série B players
Associação Portuguesa de Desportos players
Tombense Futebol Clube players
Paulista Futebol Clube players
Clube Atlético Joseense players